Georgios Palikaris (born 1946 in Piraeus) is a Greek former water polo player who competed in the 1968 Summer Olympics. At club level, he played for Olympiacos.

References

1946 births
Living people
Greek male water polo players
Olympiacos Water Polo Club players
Olympic water polo players of Greece
Water polo players at the 1968 Summer Olympics
Water polo players from Piraeus